The 2018–19 Northeastern Huskies men's basketball team represented Northeastern University during the 2018–19 NCAA Division I men's basketball season. The Huskies, led by 13th-year head coach Bill Coen, played their home games at Matthews Arena in Boston, Massachusetts as members of the Colonial Athletic Association. They finished the season 23-11, 14-4 to finish in 2nd place. In the CAA Tournament, they defeated UNC Wilmington, Charleston, and Hofstra to win the CAA Tournament. As a result, they received an automatic bid to the NCAA Tournament where they lost in the first round to Kansas.

Previous season 
The Huskies finished the 2017–18 season 23–10, 14–4 in CAA play win a share of the regular season title with College of Charleston. They defeated Delaware and UNC Wilmington to advance to the championship game of the CAA tournament where they lost to College of Charleston. Despite having 23 wins, they did not participate in a postseason tournament.

Offseason

Departures

Incoming transfers

Under NCAA transfer rules, Walters and Eboigbodin will have to sit out for the 2018–19 season, and have three years of remaining eligibility.

Recruiting
There were no recruiting class of 2018 for Northeastern.

Recruiting class of 2019

Roster

Schedule and results 

|-
!colspan=9 style=| Non-conference regular season

|-
!colspan=9 style=| CAA regular season

|-
!colspan=9 style=| CAA tournament

|-
!colspan=9 style=| NCAA tournament

References

Northeastern Huskies men's basketball seasons
Northeastern
Northeastern
Northeastern
Northeastern